Catagonus is a genus of peccaries that contains the living Chacoan peccary and several extinct species. The genus has always been restricted to South America.

Taxonomy
Catagonus is notable in that the type species, C. metropolitanus, is extinct; the living Chacoan peccary was first described in 1930 from subfossil remains, and only found alive by scientists in 1972 (an example of a Lazarus taxon).

A 2017 study on the phylogenetic systematics of Tayassuidae species suggests that Catagonus should only contain C. metropolitanus. The extinct narrow-headed peccary (C. stenocephalus) should be moved into Brasiliochoerus, while the Chacoan peccary, C. bonaerensis and C. carlesi should be placed in Parachoerus. If this is accepted, then Catagonus becomes an extinct genus once more.

References

Mammal genera
Mammal genera with one living species
Taxa named by Florentino Ameghino
Peccaries